Santissima Trinità is a Romanesque-revival church located on Via Pretoria 109 in the city of Potenza, region of Basilicata, Italy. The church is now infamous as hiding for 17 years, the body of Elisa Claps, a young woman murdered by Danilo Restivo in 1993. The parish priest at the time had denied permission for the police to search the church despite it having been the last place the young woman was seen alive. The church was only searched after Restivo was arrested in England for the murder of Heather Barnett.

Documents point to a church at the site since the 1178. Further refurbishments followed over the centuries; however this romanesque-style church was razed by an earthquake in 1857. Few traces of the previous church remain; it appears the reconstruction, begun in 1872 diverged in layout and structure, changing the church from a structure with three naves to a single nave church. The interior decoration of the church was done mainly in the 1930s, with frescoes by Mario Prayer.

References

Roman Catholic churches in Potenza
19th-century Roman Catholic church buildings in Italy